The British Newfoundland Development Corporation, or BRINCO, was incorporated by a consortium of British companies in 1953, which undertook industrial development opportunities in the Canadian province of Newfoundland and Labrador. The company was involved in the construction of the Churchill Falls Generating Station.

The concept for BRINCO was conceived in 1952 by Premier of Newfoundland and Labrador Joey Smallwood, who sought to bring industrial development to the province. Smallwood travelled to the United Kingdom to court private sector companies, offering large tracts of undeveloped resource land in both the Labrador and Newfoundland areas of the province in exchange for guaranteeing the development of any natural resources discovered.

After numerous meetings with some of the political and industrial leaders, including Sir Winston Churchill and Anthony Gustav de Rothschild, Smallwood was successful in having seven large British corporations form a consortium to explore, investigate, and, where feasible, to develop natural resources in the province.

The seven founding firms are as follows;

 N M Rothschild & Sons
 The Anglo-American Corporation of South Africa
 Bowater Paper Corporation
 English Electric Company Limited
 Frobisher Limited
 Rio Tinto Company Limited
 The Anglo-Newfoundland Development Company Limited.

They were joined by seventeen other firms before the principal agreement was signed with the Government of Newfoundland in 1953. These additional firms included Bank of Montreal, Royal Bank of Canada and Suez Canal Company.

Companies based in Newfoundland and Labrador
Canada–United Kingdom relations
Canadian subsidiaries of foreign companies
Defunct companies of Newfoundland and Labrador